Claude Frédéric-Armand Schaeffer (March 6, 1898 – August 25, 1982) was a French archeologist, born in Strasbourg, who led the French excavation team that began working on the site of Ugarit, the present day Ras Shamra in 1929, leading to the uncovering of the Ugaritic religious texts. After the Second World War he began excavating the Late Bronze Age site of Enkomi.

He was curator for the Prehistoric and Gallo-Roman Museum, Strasbourg (1924–1933) and for the Museum of National Antiquities, Saint-Germain-en-Laye (1933–1956). Schaeffer was an advocate of catastrophism. He argued that on at least five occasions catastrophic events (such as earthquakes) had destroyed Bronze Age civilizations.

Selected publications

The Cuneiform Texts of Ras Shamra-Ugarit (1939)
Stratigraphie Comparee Et Chronologie De L Asie Occidentale (1948)
Note Sur L'enceinte Mycénienne D'enkomi (Chypre) (1948)

References

External links
 Claude Schaeffer – Ancient Middle East Destruction and epic discoveries

1898 births
1982 deaths
Catastrophism
Archaeologists from Strasbourg
20th-century archaeologists
Corresponding Fellows of the British Academy